Brooke Stockham (born 20 April 1982) is an Australian Paralympic swimmer.  She was born in Townsville.  She won three bronze medals at the 2000 Sydney Games in the Women's 100 m Breaststroke SB8, Women's 200 m Medley SM8 and Women's 4x100 m Medley 34 pts events. At the 2004 Summer Paralympics she won another bronze medal in the Women's 4x100 m Medley 34 pts event.

References

External links
 

1982 births
Living people
Female Paralympic swimmers of Australia
Paralympic bronze medalists for Australia
Paralympic medalists in swimming
Swimmers at the 2000 Summer Paralympics
Swimmers at the 2004 Summer Paralympics
Medalists at the 2000 Summer Paralympics
Medalists at the 2004 Summer Paralympics
Sportspeople from Townsville
Sportswomen from Queensland
Australian female breaststroke swimmers
Australian female medley swimmers
S8-classified Paralympic swimmers
Medalists at the World Para Swimming Championships
20th-century Australian women
21st-century Australian women